Paracrocidura is a genus of shrews. They are mammals in the family Soricidae. The vernacular name large-headed shrews is sometimes collectively applied to the genus, but has also been applied to the species Crocidura grandiceps.

The genus contains the following species:
 Grauer's large-headed shrew (Paracrocidura graueri)
 Greater large-headed shrew (Paracrocidura maxima)
 Lesser large-headed shrew (Paracrocidura schoutedeni)

References

 
Mammal genera
Taxa named by Henri Heim de Balsac
Taxonomy articles created by Polbot